Blanca Judith Díaz Delgado (born 22 February 1958) is a Mexican politician affiliated with the PAN. As of 2013 she served as Senator of the LX and LXI Legislatures of the Mexican Congress representing Nuevo León. She also served as Deputy during the LIX Legislature, as well as the Congress of Nuevo León.

References

1958 births
Living people
Politicians from Mexico City
Members of the Senate of the Republic (Mexico)
Members of the Chamber of Deputies (Mexico)
National Action Party (Mexico) politicians
Women members of the Chamber of Deputies (Mexico)
Women members of the Senate of the Republic (Mexico)
Autonomous University of Nuevo León alumni
Members of the Congress of Nuevo León
20th-century Mexican politicians
20th-century Mexican women politicians
21st-century Mexican politicians
21st-century Mexican women politicians